XSS is cross-site scripting, a type of computer security vulnerability.

XSS may also refer to:

 XSS file, a Microsoft Visual Studio Dataset Designer Surface Data file
 X11 Screen Saver extension, of X11
 Assan language (ISO 639-3 code)
 Xbox Series S, a digital-only video game console

See also
 Experimental Satellite System-11 (XSS 11), a spacecraft
 CSS (disambiguation)

.